Roger Lee Hayden (born May 30, 1983) is an American professional motorcycle racer, the younger brother of both 2006 MotoGP World Champion Nicky Hayden and AMA Superbike Championship rider Tommy Hayden.

Career

In July 2007, Hayden made his MotoGP début as a wild card for Kawasaki at Mazda Raceway Laguna Seca. He piloted the Kawasaki ZX-RR to a tenth-place finish, scoring six points for Kawasaki Motors Racing.

Hayden's successful 2007 season was followed by injury in 2008. Hayden fractured his arm in March 2008 during qualifying at Daytona International Speedway. Though he recovered from his arm injury, his season was effectively brought to an end on April 19, 2008 when he was involved in a heavy crash with Robertino Pietri during qualifying at Barber Motorsports Park. As a result of the crash, Hayden suffered three breaks to his pelvis bone, three breaks to his lower left lumbar, and severe lacerations to the pinky finger on his left hand. Hayden's left pinky finger was eventually amputated after specialists determined that the digit could not be repaired. Hayden did not return to AMA competition full-time until Round 3 of the 2009 AMA season at Road Atlanta.

In January 2010 the Pedercini Team announced that Hayden will join the team to contest the 2010 Superbike World Championship season, partnering Matteo Baiocco on a Kawasaki ZX-10R.
In July 2010, after Randy de Puniet's injury at the German Grand Prix at the Sachsenring, Team LCR boss Lucio Cecchinello acquired the services of Hayden for the United States Grand Prix. Hayden also contested the Moto2 race at the Indianapolis Grand Prix, riding a Moriwaki run by former World Champion Kevin Schwantz.

Career statistics

AMA Pro Racing

Supersport

Superstock

Superbike

Daytona Sportbike

Grand Prix motorcycle racing results
(key)

Superbike World Championship

References

External links

 Official website

1983 births
American motorcycle racers
Kawasaki Motors Racing MotoGP riders
Living people
Sportspeople from Owensboro, Kentucky
Moto2 World Championship riders
AMA Superbike Championship riders
AMA Supersport Championship riders
Superbike World Championship riders
LCR Team MotoGP riders
MotoGP World Championship riders
AMA Grand National Championship riders